Coppola Industria Alimentare is an Italian food company producing canned tomatoes and vegetables.

The company is based in Mercato San Severino, close to Salerno in southern Italy, within the main Italian industrial tomato processing district.

Coppola Industria Alimentare distributes the majority of its products to international markets.

External links
Company's homepage

Food and drink companies of Italy
Companies based in Salerno
Food manufacturers of Italy
Food and drink companies established in 1903